Squalius pyrenaicus is a species of freshwater fish in the family Cyprinidae. It is found in Portugal and Spain.

Its natural habitats are rivers, intermittent rivers, and water storage areas. It is becoming rare due to habitat loss.

References

Squalius
Endemic fish of the Iberian Peninsula
Fish described in 1868
Taxa named by Albert Günther
Taxonomy articles created by Polbot
Taxobox binomials not recognized by IUCN